USS Cates (DE-763) was a  built for the United States Navy during World War II.  She served in the Atlantic Ocean and the Pacific Ocean and provided escort service against submarine and air attack for Navy vessels and convoys.

Namesake
William Finnic Cates was born on 30 April 1916 in Drummonds, Tennessee. He enlisted in the United States Naval Reserve on 21 January 1942. While serving as Seaman Second Class on the  he was killed in action on 12 November 1942 when a Japanese torpedo plane, which he kept under fire while refusing to leave his station, crashed into the ship. He was posthumously awarded the Navy Cross.

Construction and commissioning
Cates was launched 10 October 1943 by Tampa Shipbuilding Co., Inc., Tampa, Florida; sponsored by Mrs. P. Dyer; commissioned 15 December 1943 and reported to the Atlantic Fleet.

History

World War II North Atlantic operations 
Between 27 February and 1 May 1944, Cates guarded two convoys carrying American troops to ports in Ireland and Wales in the lengthy preparations for the invasion of Normandy. Overcoming the threat of submarine attack and the ever-present hazards of vicious North Atlantic weather, she aided in the completely safe passage of critically needed men.
 
After a brief period training with submarines from New London, Connecticut, Cates completed 1944 with five convoy voyages from New York to ports in Ireland, Great Britain, and France escorting tankers, carrying critical petroleum products to support the push of the Allies across Europe. Cates opened 1945 with a brief training period in Casco Bay, Maine, then a return to tanker convoy duty from Boston, Massachusetts, to Scotland, returning to New York 18 February. Two weeks later she sailed in the escort of another convoy, but had to break off and return to Earle, New Jersey, for repairs, followed by refresher training in Casco Bay. This training became most realistic when Cates took part in a 2-week anti-submarine sweep along the northeast coast. She returned to New York 20 April, and sailed 4 days later escorting tankers to Liverpool.

Transfer to Pacific Theatre operations 
Returning to New York with empty tankers 23 May 1945, Cates sailed on to training in Cuban waters, passed through the Panama Canal, and arrived at Pearl Harbor 31 July for training and overhaul. Arriving at Eniwetok 30 August, she began six months of convoy escort supporting the redeployment of troops in the Far East, calling at ports in the Philippines, Japan, and Okinawa until 18 February 1946.

Post-War decommissioning 

She then cleared for San Pedro, California, Norfolk, Virginia, and Green Cove Springs, Florida. She arrived at the latter port 22 April for duty training reservists until 28 March 1947, when she was decommissioned there. Cates was transferred to France under the Military Assistance Program on 11 November 1950. She served in the French Navy as Soudanais (F.722) until stricken and scrapped in 1959.

See also
List of Escorteurs of the French Navy

References

External links 
 

Cannon-class destroyer escorts of the United States Navy
Ships built in Tampa, Florida
1943 ships
World War II frigates and destroyer escorts of the United States